Nene Valley Colour Coated Ware (or Castor Ware) is a type of Romano-British ceramic produced in the lower Nene Valley centred on Durobrivae (Water Newton) from the mid-2nd to 4th centuries AD. These places are closest to the main town of Peterborough which vies with Northampton, Wisbech and London museums as main repositories and exhibition locations of finds; arguably the most impressive of which are at the British Museum. The longer name is often abbreviated to NVCC.

Industry 

Pottery manufacture locally started in the mid first century AD, with workshops associated with the Roman fort at Longthorpe, Peterborough with an expansion for several miles along the Nene valley between Wansford and Peterborough in the second century. The production centre was at the Roman town at Durobrivae (Water Newton) although the NVCC products are associated with a number of kilns found throughout the area at Stibbington, Sibson-cum-Stibbington, Chesterton, Yaxley, and Stanground.

Fabric 

The NVCC ceramic is a hard, smooth-textured fabric with finely irregular fracture. It is usually coloured white to off-white. The slip has a variable colour, dark brown to black, mottled lighter orange or orange-brown where thinner. The temper includes an abundant amount of very fine quartz sand  and occasional larger quartz grains, red or orange and black flecks and occasional pale clay pellets.

Decoration 

The decoration of NVCC vessels is quite distinctive. The most common forms are beakers; both cornice-rimmed and bag-beakers. Where decoration occurs it includes barbotine (both under and over the slip), rouletting and grooving. Hunt scenes in barbotine decoration are well known from the earlier part of the industry, with the use of whorls instead of these beginning in the 3rd century AD.

Institutions 

The following institutions are listed as having considerable collections of NVCC Ware collections:
British Museum
Peterborough Museum

See also 
 Nene Valley (disambiguation)
 List of Romano-British pottery

References

External links 
 Nene Valley Colour Coated Cup with hunt scene decoration in the British Museum

Romano-British pottery